David Khari Webber Chappelle (born August 24, 1973) is an American stand-up comedian and actor. He is best known for his satirical comedy sketch series Chappelle's Show (2003–2006), which he starred in until quitting in the middle of production during the third season. After a hiatus, Chappelle returned to performing stand-up comedy across the U.S. By 2006, Chappelle was called the "comic genius of America" by Esquire and, in 2013, "the best" by a Billboard writer. In 2017, Rolling Stone ranked him No. 9 in their "50 Best Stand Up Comics of All Time."

Chappelle has appeared in several films, including Robin Hood: Men in Tights (1993), The Nutty Professor (1996), Con Air (1997), You've Got Mail (1998), Blue Streak (1999), Undercover Brother (2002), Dave Chappelle's Block Party (2005), Chi-Raq (2015) and A Star Is Born (2018). His first lead role was in the 1998 comedy film Half Baked, which he co-wrote. Chappelle also starred in the ABC comedy series Buddies (1996). In 2016, he signed a $20-million-per-release comedy-special deal with Netflix and released six stand-up specials under the deal.

He has received numerous accolades, including six Emmy Awards and four Grammy Awards, as well as the Mark Twain Prize for American Humor in 2019, which is presented by the Kennedy Center as America's highest comedy honor. Chappelle has received two Primetime Emmy Award for Outstanding Guest Actor in a Comedy Series for hosting Saturday Night Live in 2016 and 2020. Chappelle received four Grammy Awards for Best Comedy Album for The Age of Spin (2018), Equanimity & The Bird Revelation (2019), Sticks & Stones (2020) and The Closer (2021).

Early life 

David Khari Webber Chappelle was born on August 24, 1973, in Washington, D.C. His father, William David Chappelle III, was a professor of vocal performance and the dean of students at Antioch College in Yellow Springs, Ohio. His mother, Yvonne Seon (formerly Chappelle), worked for Congolese Prime Minister Patrice Lumumba, is a Unitarian Universalist minister, and worked as a professor and university administrator at several institutions including Wright State University and Prince George's Community College. Chappelle has a stepmother and a stepbrother.

Chappelle grew up in Silver Spring, Maryland, and attended Woodlin Elementary School. His parents were politically active, and family house visitors included Pete Seeger and Johnny Hartman. Hartman predicted Chappelle would be a comedian and, around this time, Chappelle's comic inspiration came from Eddie Murphy and Richard Pryor. After his parents separated, Chappelle stayed in Washington with his mother while spending summers with his father in Ohio. In high school he worked as an usher in Ford's Theatre. He attended DC's Eastern High School for a short time before transferring to Duke Ellington School of the Arts, where he studied theater arts, graduating in 1991.

Career

Early career 

Chappelle was featured in a montage of random people telling a joke in the first episode of ABC's America's Funniest People, airing on September 13, 1990. Chappelle moved to New York City to pursue a career as a comedian. He performed at Harlem's Apollo Theater in front of the "Amateur Night" audience, but he was booed off stage. Chappelle described the experience as the moment that gave him the courage to continue his show business aspirations. He quickly made a name for himself on the New York comedy circuit, even performing in the city's parks. In addition to weekend stand-up gigs, he honed his craft at Monday night "open mic" performances at places like the Boston Comedy Club on West 3rd Street, as late as the summer 1994. In 1992, he won critical and popular acclaim for his television appearance in Russell Simmons' Def Comedy Jam on HBO. It was his appearance on this show that allowed his popularity to truly begin rising, eventually allowing him to become a regular guest on late-night television shows such as Politically Incorrect, Late Show with David Letterman, The Howard Stern Show, and Late Night with Conan O'Brien. Whoopi Goldberg nicknamed him "The Kid". At 19, he made his film debut as "Ahchoo" in Mel Brooks' Robin Hood: Men in Tights. He also appeared on Star Search three times but lost to competing comedian Lester Barrie; Chappelle later joked about becoming more successful than Barrie. The same year, Chappelle was offered the role of Benjamin Buford "Bubba" Blue in Forrest Gump. Concerned the character was demeaning and the movie would bomb, he turned down the part. He parodied the film in the 1997 short Bowl of Pork, where a dim-witted black man is responsible for the Rodney King beating, the LA riots and O. J. Simpson's being accused of murder. Chappelle played another supporting role in an early Doug Liman film, Getting In, in 1994. At age 19, he was the opening act for R&B soul singer Aretha Franklin.

Chappelle attracted the attention of television network executives and developed numerous pilots but none were picked up for development into a series. In 1995, he made a guest appearance on an episode of ABC's popular sitcom Home Improvement. The storyline had Chappelle and real-life friend and comedian Jim Breuer ask Tim Taylor for advice on their girlfriends. The characters' single outing in the episode proved so popular that ABC decided to give them their own spin-off sitcom titled Buddies. However, after taping a pilot episode, Breuer was fired and replaced with actor Christopher Gartin. Buddies premiered in March 1996 to disappointing ratings and the show was canceled after only five episodes out of 13 that had been produced.

After the failure of Buddies, Chappelle starred in another pilot. According to Chappelle, the network was uncomfortable with the African-American cast and wanted white actors added. Chappelle resisted and subsequently accused the network of racism. Shortly afterward Chappelle's father died and, after returning to Ohio, he considered leaving the entertainment business.

He later appeared as a stand-up insult comic who targets patrons of a nightclub in the 1996 comedy The Nutty Professor starring Eddie Murphy, one of his major comedic influences. He had a minor role in 1997's Con Air. At the beginning of 1998, he did a stand-up performance for HBO Comedy Half-Hour. That same year, he appeared in "Pilots and Pens Lost", an episode of The Larry Sanders Shows sixth season, in which he and the executives of the show's unnamed television network satirize the treatment that scriptwriters and show creators were subjected to, as well as the executives' knee-jerk tendencies toward racial stereotypes.

He and Neal Brennan co-wrote the 1998 cult stoner film Half Baked, Chappelle's first starring role, about a group of marijuana-smoking friends trying to get their other friend out of jail. It made money at the box office and remains a classic "stoner" film, a genre that includes the Cheech & Chong films as well as more recent fare like Judd Apatow's Pineapple Express. In December 1998, Chappelle appeared as Tom Hanks' character's friend and confidant in You've Got Mail. In 1999, he appeared in the Martin Lawrence film Blue Streak.

In 2000, Chappelle recorded his first hour-long HBO special, Dave Chappelle: Killin' Them Softly, in Washington, D.C. He also starred alongside Norm Macdonald in the 2000 comedy film Screwed. He followed this with an appearance as "Conspiracy Brother" in the 2002 racial satire Undercover Brother.

2003–2006: Chappelle's Show 

In 2003, Chappelle debuted his own weekly sketch comedy show on Comedy Central called Chappelle's Show. The show parodied many aspects of American culture, including racial stereotypes, politics and pop culture. Along with comedy sketches, the show also featured musical performances by mostly hip-hop and soul artists. He promoted the work of other black comedians as well, most notably Paul Mooney and Charlie Murphy.

Due to the show's popularity, Comedy Central's new parent company Viacom offered Chappelle a $55 million contract (giving Chappelle a share of DVD sales) to continue production of Chappelle's Show for two more years while allowing him to do side projects. Chappelle has said that sketches are not his favorite form of comedy, and that the show's format was similar to short films.

In June 2004, based on the popularity of the "Rick James" sketch, it was announced that Chappelle was in talks to portray James in a biopic from Paramount Pictures, also owned by Viacom. James' estate disagreed with the proposed comical tone of the film and put a halt to the talks.

That same month, Chappelle recorded his second comedy special, this time airing on Showtime, Dave Chappelle: For What It's Worth, at San Francisco's Fillmore Auditorium, where Lenny Bruce, George Carlin, Richard Pryor, and Robin Williams had performed.

Season 3 problems 

In a June 2004 stand-up performance in Sacramento, California, Chappelle walked off the stage after berating his audience for constantly shouting "I'm Rick James, bitch!" which had become a catchphrase from his popular "Rick James" sketch. After a few minutes, Chappelle returned and resumed by saying, "The show is ruining my life." He stated that he disliked working "20 hours a day" and that the popularity of the show was making it difficult for him to continue his stand-up career, which was "the most important thing" to him. He told the audience:

Season 3 was scheduled to begin airing on May 31, 2005, but earlier in May, Chappelle surprised fans and the entertainment industry when he abruptly left during production and took a trip to South Africa. Chappelle said that he was unhappy with the direction the show had taken, and expressed in an interview with Time magazine his need for reflection in the face of tremendous stress:

Immediately following Chappelle's departure, tabloids speculated that Chappelle's exit was driven by drug addiction or a mental problem, rather than the ethical and professional concerns that Chappelle had articulated.

Chappelle's decision to quit the show meant walking away from his $50 million contract with Comedy Central and forming a rift with longtime collaborator Neal Brennan.

The show still plays in syndication on several television networks, despite the relatively small number of episodes compared to most American syndicated television programs. Chappelle's abrupt departure from his show continues to be a focus of interviews and profiles of Chappelle and of Chappelle's own comedy. In Bird Revelation, Chappelle draws an analogy between his departure and the book Pimp, the memoir of Iceberg Slim.

2004: Dave Chappelle's Block Party 

Chappelle was the star and a producer of the Michel Gondry-directed documentary Dave Chappelle's Block Party, which chronicles his hosting a free concert in the Clinton Hill neighborhood of Brooklyn on September 18, 2004. Several musical artists, including Kanye West, The Roots, Erykah Badu, Mos Def, Dead Prez and Jill Scott, are featured in the movie both performing in the concert and in conversation off-stage; Chappelle brought Yellow Springs residents to Brooklyn at his own expense. Another highlight of the event was the temporary reunion of 1990s hip-hop group The Fugees.

Chappelle toured several cities in February and March 2006 to promote the film under the name "Block Party All-Stars Featuring Dave Chappelle". Universal Pictures' genre division, Rogue Pictures, released the film in the U.S. on March 3, 2006. It was a success, grossing a total of $11.7 million on a $3 million budget.

2005–2013: Infrequent comedy appearances 
In June 2005, Chappelle performed impromptu stand-up shows in Los Angeles, then went on a tour that began in Newport, Kentucky, not far from his Ohio home. On May 11, 2006, he made a prearranged, but quietly marketed, surprise appearance at Towson University's annual Tigerfest celebration. He made another appearance on HBO's Def Poetry, where he performed two poems, titled "Fuck Ashton Kutcher" and "How I Got the Lead on Jeopardy!"

In an interview with Oprah Winfrey that aired on February 3, 2006, Chappelle explained his reasons for quitting Chappelle's Show. He also expressed his contempt for the entertainment industry's tone-deafness regarding black entertainers and audiences:

Chappelle was interviewed for Inside the Actors Studio on December 18, 2005, at Pace University's Michael Schimmel Center for the Arts. The show premiered on February 12, 2006. Four days earlier, he had introduced the musical tribute to Sly Stone at the 48th Annual Grammy Awards.

Chappelle said on Inside the Actors Studio that the death of his father seven years prior influenced his decision to go to South Africa. By throwing himself into his work, he had not taken a chance to mourn his father's death. He also said the rumors that he was in drug or psychiatric treatment only persuaded him to stay in South Africa. He said,

Chappelle said that he felt some of his sketches were "socially irresponsible." He singled out the "pixie sketch" in which pixies appear to people and encourage them to reinforce stereotypes of their races. In the sketch, Chappelle is wearing blackface and is dressed as a character in a minstrel show. According to Chappelle, a white crew member laughed during its filming in a way that made him uncomfortable, saying "It was the first time I felt that someone was not laughing with me but laughing at me."

During this time, Chappelle did not rule out returning to Chappelle's Show to "finish what we started," but promised that he would not return without changes to the production, such as a better working environment. He wanted to donate half of the DVD sales to charity. Chappelle expressed disdain at the possibility of his material from the unfinished third season being aired, saying that to do so would be "a bully move," and that he would not return to the show if Comedy Central were to air the unfinished material. On July 9, 2006, Comedy Central aired the first episode of Chappelle's Show: The Lost Episodes. After the DVD release, Chappelle was interviewed by Anderson Cooper on CNN and reiterated he would not return to Chappelle's Show. An uncensored DVD release of the episodes was made available on July 25.

Chappelle has been known to make impromptu and unannounced appearances at comedy venues, and continues to do so following his post–Chappelle's Show return to stand-up comedy.

In April 2007, Chappelle set a stand-up endurance record at the Laugh Factory Sunset Strip comedy club, beating comedian Dane Cook's record of three hours and 50 minutes. In December of the same year, Chappelle broke his own record with a time of six hours and 12 minutes. Cook reclaimed the record in January 2008, with a time of seven hours. On November 19, 2009, Chappelle performed at the Laugh Factory again, where it was speculated that he would attempt to take back the record. However, according to the club owner, he was disqualified after he left the stage five hours into his routine.

Chappelle again appeared on Inside the Actors Studio and, in celebration of the show's 200th episode, he interviewed the show's usual host, James Lipton. The episode aired on November 11, 2008. He appeared again on Inside the Actors Studio in 2013, for its 250th episode.

In February 2009, Chappelle did a four-hour set at Comic Strip Live in New York.

In August 2011, Chappelle appeared at Comedy Jam in San Francisco.

2013–2017: Career comeback 

In August 2013, Chappelle returned to full-time touring stand-up, as a headliner, when he was featured during the Oddball Comedy & Curiosity festival. Sponsored by Funny or Die, Chappelle co-headlined with comedy act Flight of the Conchords.

During a stop in Hartford, Chappelle walked off the stage due to heckling from the crowd that lasted throughout his entire performance. The heckling was so raucous that it drowned out Chappelle's voice over the P.A. system and included chants of "White Power", a line used in a Chappelle's Show episode, that was viewed as wildly uncalled-for and out-of-context by other audience members who later wrote about the event. A few days later, Chappelle stopped in Chicago for a performance. The comedy website ComedyHype.com acquired and released audio of him on stage responding to the heckling. Chappelle referenced the Hartford incident, stating that "young, white, alcoholic[s]" should be blamed for the prior incident, that he hoped North Korea would bomb Hartford, that in the future he would not stop in Hartford for gas, and finally summarizing his feelings on the situation by saying, "Fuck Hartford!" However, in August 2014 Chappelle returned to Hartford for a surprise appearance at the 2014 Oddball Festival and received standing ovations during his set.

In June 2014, Chappelle made his first major New York City appearance in eleven years, performing ten nights at Radio City Music Hall. Chappelle promoted the dates by appearing on The Today Show, The Tonight Show Starring Jimmy Fallon and Late Show with David Letterman.

In 2015, Chappelle appeared in the Spike Lee film Chi-Raq, his first film role in 13 years.

On November 12, 2016, Chappelle made his hosting debut on Saturday Night Live the weekend of Donald Trump winning the 2016 presidential election. The show also featured A Tribe Called Quest as the musical guest. In his opening monologue, Chappelle tackled Trump and the election head on. He ended his monologue by stating, "I'm wishing Donald Trump luck, and I'm going to give him a chance, and we, the historically disenfranchised, demand that he give us one too." His performance on SNL received widespread acclaim from critics and audiences alike. At the 69th Primetime Emmy Awards, he received an Emmy Award for Outstanding Guest Actor in a Comedy Series for his appearance. He donated the Emmy to his former high school while filming an episode of Jerry Seinfeld's Netflix series, Comedians in Cars Getting Coffee (Season 10, Episode 2: "Nobody Says, 'I Wish I Had A Camera'").

On November 21, 2016, Netflix announced that they would be releasing three new stand-up comedy specials from Chappelle in 2017, with Chappelle being paid $20 million per special. The first two specials were released on Netflix on March 21, 2017, and hail directly from Chappelle's personal comedy vault. "Deep in the Heart of Texas" was filmed at Austin City Limits Live in April 2015, and "The Age of Spin" was filmed at the Hollywood Palladium in March 2016. The specials marked the comedian's first concert specials released in 12 years, and proved to be an immediate success as Netflix announced a month later that they were the most viewed comedy specials in Netflix's history.

The third special, Equanimity, was filmed in September 2017 at the Warner Theater in Washington, D.C., and then on November 20, 2017, Chappelle filmed a fourth special, The Bird Revelation, at The Comedy Store in Los Angeles. On December 22, 2017, Netflix announced the expansion of the deal to include The Bird Revelation, which was released with Equanimity on December 31.

2018 and 2019 

In January 2018 at the 60th Annual Grammy Awards, Chappelle received a Grammy Award for Best Comedy Album for his first two 2017 specials The Age of Spin & Deep in the Heart of Texas. In September 2018, Chappelle's Equanimity special received an Emmy Award for Outstanding Variety Special (Pre-Recorded). In October 2018, Chappelle returned to the big screen as "Noodles", Jackson Maine's best friend and retired musician in Bradley Cooper's directorial debut, a remake of A Star Is Born. The film was a massive critical and commercial success. He was nominated along with the cast for the Screen Actors Guild Award for Best Cast in a Motion Picture. In 2018, Chappelle and Jon Stewart joined forces for a duo comedy tour in the United States, and across the United Kingdom. He has also collaborated with Aziz Ansari for three stand-up shows in Austin, Texas at the Paramount Theater.

In February 2019, Chappelle was nominated for and won the Grammy Award for Best Comedy Album for Equanimity and Bird Revelation.

In 2019, Chappelle was chosen to receive the annual Mark Twain Prize for American Humor presented by The Kennedy Center. President of the Kennedy Center Deborah Rutter stated "Dave is the embodiment of Mark Twain's observation that 'against the assault of humor, nothing can stand'... and for three decades, Dave has challenged us to see hot-button issues from his entirely original yet relatable experience." The set of people honoring Chappelle included Jon Stewart, Bradley Cooper, Morgan Freeman, Lorne Michaels, Tiffany Haddish, Aziz Ansari, Sarah Silverman, Neal Brennan, Q-Tip, Mos Def, John Legend, Frederic Yonnet, Erykah Badu, Common, SNL cast members Kenan Thompson, Michael Che and Colin Jost, as well as Eddie Murphy. The Prize was awarded at the Kennedy Center gala on October 27, 2019. The ceremony was broadcast on PBS January 7, 2020. The Mayor of the District of Columbia, Muriel Bowser, declared the day of the award ceremony "Dave Chappelle Day" in Washington, D.C.

On August 26, 2019, Chappelle's fifth Netflix special, Dave Chappelle: Sticks & Stones, was released. The special garnered controversy (receiving an average score of 5.70 from Rotten Tomatoes critics), and backlash for jokes about abuse allegations against singers Michael Jackson and R. Kelly, as well as for jokes about the LGBT community and cancel culture. However it received overwhelming praise from audiences (with a 99% audience approval rating on Rotten Tomatoes) and in 2020, Sticks & Stones won the Grammy Award for Best Comedy Album.

2020 
On June 12, 2020, Netflix released 8:46, a 27-minute and 20-second video of newly recorded stand-up by Chappelle on the YouTube channel "Netflix Is a Joke". The private event was held outdoors on June 6, 2020, in Yellow Springs, Ohio, where audience members observed social distancing rules and wore masks to prevent the spread of COVID-19. The title was chosen in reference to the 8 minutes and 46 seconds that police officer Derek Chauvin knelt on the neck of George Floyd, a black man, murdering him. Chappelle touches on Floyd's murder and subsequent protests and takes aim at Don Lemon, Laura Ingraham and Candace Owens.

Expanding on the concept of the socially distanced comedy presentation, beginning with a pair of performances in late June 2020 and officially kicking off with a Fourth of July celebration, "Chappelle and friends" hosted what became known as "Chappelle Summer Camp", which brought live performances to a masked, socially distanced audience at Wirrig Pavilion, in Yellow Springs, Ohio. These shows featured regular performances from comedians Michelle Wolf, Mohammed Amer and Donnell Rawlings, as well as Chappelle's tour DJ, DJ Trauma and frequent special guests including Jon Stewart, Chris Rock, Louis CK, Sarah Silverman, David Letterman, Bill Burr, Michael Che, Brian Regan, Chris Tucker, Kevin Hart, Ali Wong, Trevor Noah, Tiffany Haddish, with musical guests John Mayer, Common, and many others. After several shows in July, some issues arose from neighbors' complaints of noise and disturbances, local zoning officials granted a special variance allowing the performances to continue through October 4, 2020. The Chappelle Summer Camp series of shows ended suddenly September 25, 2020, when Elaine Chappelle announced in a closed Facebook fan group that there had been a possible COVID-19 exposure in their inner circle, and all further performances were canceled.

It was announced that Chappelle would return to host Saturday Night Live the weekend of the 2020 United States presidential election, his second time giving a post-presidential election monologue. Due to the effect of the COVID-19 pandemic on the vote count, the results were delayed and announced earlier that Saturday. In response to unfounded allegations that Joe Biden's presidency had been stolen from Donald Trump, Chappelle's offered jokes ranging from Trump's handling of the pandemic to his resulting legacy, and the political future of the United States, in his 16-minute opening monologue:

Critics and audiences praised the monologue describing it as "scathing", "illuminating", and "powerful."

In December 2020, Chappelle's company, Iron Table Holdings purchased a fire station near his Yellow Springs, Ohio home, with plans to convert it into a comedy club. He also retrofitted a mechanic's garage in the same village into a clubhouse, and dubbed it "The Shack", for podcasting.

2021–present 
On October 5, 2021, Chappelle starred in his sixth and final Netflix special The Closer. In The Closer, Chappelle made jokes about gay and transgender people, particularly transgender women, that some called transphobic. Simultaneously, Chappelle argued that he was not anti-transgender, bringing up his opposition to North Carolina's anti-transgender bathroom laws and his friendship with late Daphne Dorman. The special was met with some backlash, including from students of Chappelle's alma mater Duke Ellington School. This included a portion where he identified himself as a "TERF." On October 20, Netflix employees organized a walkout demonstrating their support of the transgender community, claiming Chappelle's set is an example of the rhetoric that leads to transgender inequality and violence against transgender people. The protestors demanded that The Closer be taken off of Netflix. CEO Ted Sarandos acknowledged that "storytelling has real impact in the real world" but refused to take down the special, stating that he "does not believe it falls into hate speech."  In November 2021, Saturday Night Live lampooned the controversy during its Weekend Update segment, stating, "A Washington D.C. art school is postponing renaming its theater, after alumni Dave Chappelle's Netflix controversy. Well, of course, because God forbid, you should name a building after someone problematic in Washington D.C." In summer of 2022, Chappelle announced that he would not give his name to the Duke Ellington School theater, instead insisting it should be named the Theater for Artistic Freedom and Expression.

Dave Chappelle: Live in Real Life, a documentary covering Chappelle's concerts in Yellow Springs during the COVID-19 pandemic, premiered at Tribeca Film Festival in June 2021, followed by a series of roadshow events in the United States and Canada and a limited theatrical release on November 19, 2021.

In the early hours of May 4, 2022, Chappelle was performing at the Hollywood Bowl in Los Angeles, California, as part of the Netflix is a Joke Fest, where he was tackled onstage by a member of the audience, who was swiftly subdued by security. The attacker was later found to have been armed with a replica handgun containing a knife blade. Chappelle's 4-night stint at the Hollywood Bowl ties him with Monty Python for the most headlined shows by a comedian at the venue.

On November 12, 2022, Chappelle hosted Saturday Night Live for the third time. On February 5, 2023 he received his fourth Grammy Award for Best Comedy Album for The Closer.

Influences 
In his interview with Inside the Actors Studio host James Lipton, he said that his biggest influences in comedy are Richard Pryor, Eddie Murphy, Mort Sahl, Chris Rock, Paul Mooney, and Mel Blanc.

When asked about his earliest influence in comedy, Chappelle said:

When asked about the biggest influence on him in comedy, Chappelle spoke of Richard Pryor:

Awards and accolades 

Chappelle has received many awards and nominations for his work in stand-up and television including three consecutive Grammy Awards for Best Comedy Album. He has also received five Primetime Emmy Awards and one Screen Actors Guild Award nomination along with the ensemble of A Star Is Born.

In 2017, Columbia, South Carolina Mayor Steven Benjamin declared February 3 "Dave Chappelle Day" when Chappelle spoke at the Chappelle Auditorium at Allen University, a building named after his great-grandfather, Bishop William David Chappelle, who worked at the university.

In 2019, Chappelle was awarded the prestigious Mark Twain Prize for American Humor at the John F. Kennedy Center for Performing Arts. Those to honor Chappelle at the event included Jon Stewart, Bradley Cooper, Aziz Ansari, Sarah Silverman, Chris Tucker, Frederic Yonnet and Lorne Michaels. The award ceremony was turned into a television special and released on Netflix and received a Primetime Emmy Award for Outstanding Variety Special (Pre-Recorded) nomination.

His work, as well as that of Margaret Cho, was also the subject of a book by Canadian dramaturg Elizabeth Ludwig, American Stand-Up and Sketch Comedy, that was published at the end of 2010.

Activism and advocacy

Philanthropy 
In 2004, he donated his time to Seeds of Peace International Camp, a camp located in Otisfield, Maine, which brings together young leaders from communities in conflict.

Chappelle supports his high school, Duke Ellington School of the Arts. He has financially contributed to the school over the years, visited and gave a commencement speech. During his acceptance speech at the 2017 Emmy Awards, Chappelle gave a shout-out to D.C. Public Schools. In November 2021, the school was set to rename their auditorium in Chappelle's honor. Following controversy in response to jokes made in The Closer, the renaming ceremony was delayed until April 2022. Instead, Chappelle made an unannounced stop at the school to host a school assembly and Q&A session, asking only students who had an issue with Chappelle to come forward to ask questions. Following the assembly, the school decided to go forward with renaming the auditorium, respecting the wishes of school co-founder Peggy Cooper Cafritz.

Politics 
Chappelle endorsed Andrew Yang in the 2020 United States presidential election.

In December 2021, Chappelle told the Yellow Springs, Ohio, village council that he would cancel his planned business investments, including his restaurant and comedy club, if it approved a zoning change to allow a multifamily affordable housing project. The affordable housing had been negotiated between the village and the developer as a condition of approval for its plan to build 143 single-unit homes. On February 7, 2022, he again spoke up against the zoning change at the council meeting held to vote on the approval, calling the council "clowns" and reminding them that his business was worth $65 million a year. The council failed to approve the change, deadlocking at 2–2, with one recusal.

Personal life 
Chappelle married Elaine Mendoza Erfe in 2001. The couple have two sons, Sulayman and Ibrahim, and one daughter, Sanaa. They live on a  farm near Yellow Springs, Ohio. Chappelle also owned several houses in Xenia, Ohio. He told Yellow Springs' residents in September 2006: 

Chappelle converted to Islam in 1991. He told Time magazine in May 2005:
 Chappelle appears in a video explaining the religious history of the Well of Zamzam in Mecca.

His great-grandfather Bishop William D. Chappelle, born into slavery in 1857, served as a president of Allen University and led a delegation of African Americans who met President Woodrow Wilson at the White House. His great-great-grandfather Robert J. Palmer was a member of the South Carolina Legislature, then majority black, during Reconstruction. His grand-uncle W. D. Chappelle Jr. was a physician and surgeon who opened the People's Infirmary around 1915, a small hospital and surgery practice in Columbia, South Carolina, during a time when segregation prevented many African Americans from having access to healthcare.

Filmography

Film

Television

Stand-up specials

References

External links 

 
 "Transcripts: Interview with Dave Chappelle". Anderson Cooper 360, July 7, 2006. CNN.
 
 "If He Hollers Let Him Go". The Believer, October 2013. Rachel Kaadzi Ghansah.

 
1973 births
Living people
20th-century African-American people
21st-century African-American people
20th-century American comedians
21st-century American comedians
20th-century American male actors
21st-century American male actors
20th-century Muslims
21st-century Muslims
African-American film producers
African American–Jewish relations
African-American male comedians
American male comedians
African-American Muslims
African-American stand-up comedians
American sketch comedians
American stand-up comedians
African-American television producers
American comedy writers
American humorists
American male film actors
American male non-fiction writers
American male screenwriters
American male television actors
American male voice actors
American satirists
Audiobook narrators
Comedians from Maryland
Comedians from Ohio
Comedians from Washington, D.C.
Converts to Islam
American Muslims
Film producers from Ohio
Grammy Award winners
Journalists from Ohio
Male actors from Maryland
Male actors from Ohio
Male actors from Washington, D.C.
Mark Twain Prize recipients
Muslim male comedians
People from Silver Spring, Maryland
People from Xenia, Ohio
People from Yellow Springs, Ohio
Primetime Emmy Award winners
Screenwriters from Maryland
Screenwriters from Ohio
Screenwriters from Washington, D.C.
Third Man Records artists